John Maclure may refer to:

Sir John Maclure, 1st Baronet (1835–1901), British businessman and Conservative politician
John McLure (steamer captain), American steamship captain, boatbuilder, and businessman
Sir John Edward Stanley Maclure, 2nd Baronet (1869–1938), of the Maclure baronets
Sir John William Spencer Maclure, 3rd Baronet (1899–1980), of the Maclure baronets
Sir John Robert Spencer Maclure, 4th Baronet (born 1934), of the Maclure baronets

See also
John Maclure Community School, British Columbia